"" ("Awaken Thee, Romanian!") is the national anthem of Romania and former national anthem of Moldova.

The lyrics were composed by Andrei Mureșanu (1816–1863), and the music was popular (it was chosen for the poem by Gheorghe Ucenescu, as most sources say). It was written and published during the 1848 revolution, initially with the name "Un răsunet" ("An echo"), as a lyrical response to Vasile Alecsandri’s poem "Către Români" ("To Romanians"), later known as "Deșteptarea României" ("The Awakening of Romania"), from which Mureșanu took inspiration for many of the themes and motifs of his own lyrics, a fact that is reflected in the overall similarity between the two poems. The original text was written in the Romanian Cyrillic alphabet. It was first sung in late June in the same year in the city of Brașov, on the streets of the Șcheii Brașovului neighborhood and it became immediately the revolutionary anthem.

Since then, this patriotic song has been sung during all major Romanian conflicts, including during the 1989 anti-communist revolution. After the revolution, it became the national anthem on 24 January 1990, replacing the communist-era national anthem "Trei culori" ("Three colours").

29 July, the "National Anthem Day" (Ziua Imnului național), is an annual observance in Romania.

The anthem was also used on various solemn occasions in the Moldavian Democratic Republic during its brief existence between 1917 and 1918. Between 1991 and 1994, "Deșteaptă-te, române!" was the national anthem of Moldova before it was subsequently replaced by the current Moldovan anthem "Limba noastră" ("Our language").

History 

The melody was originally a sentimental song called "Din sânul maicii mele" composed by Anton Pann after hearing the poem. In 1848 Andrei Mureșanu wrote the poem Un răsunet and asked Gheorghe Ucenescu, a Șcheii Brașovului Church singer, to find him a suitable melody. After Ucenescu sang him several lay melodies, Mureșanu chose Anton Pann's song instead.

First sung during the uprisings of 1848, "Deșteaptă-te române!" became a favourite among Romanians and it has seen play during various historical events, including as part of Romania's declaration of independence from the Ottoman Empire during the  Russo-Turkish War (1877–78), and during World War I. The song received particularly heavy radio broadcast in the days following King Michael's Coup of 23 August 1944, when Romania switched sides, turning against Nazi Germany and joining the Allies in World War II.

After the Communist Party abolished the monarchy on 30 December 1947, "Deșteaptă-te române!" and other patriotic songs closely associated with the previous regime were outlawed. Nicolae Ceaușescu's government permitted the song to be played and sung in public, but it was not given state recognition as the national anthem of the Socialist Republic of Romania.

The song was officially adopted as the national anthem on 24 January 1990, shortly after the Romanian Revolution of December 1989.

The overall message of the anthem is a "call to action"; it proposes a "now or never" urge for change present in many national anthems like the French revolutionary song "La Marseillaise" – hence why Nicolae Bălcescu called it the "Romanian Marseillaise".

Another anthem

"Hora Unirii" ("Hora of the Union"), written by poet Vasile Alecsandri (1821–1890), which was sung a great deal on the occasion of the Union of the Principalities (1859) and on other occasions. "Hora Unirii" is sung on the Romanian folk tune of a slow but energetic round dance joined by the whole attendance (hora).

Lyrics
Romania's national anthem has eleven stanzas. Today, only the first, second, fourth, and last are sung on official occasions, as established by Romanian law. At major events such as the National Holiday on 1 December, the full version is sung, accompanied by 21-gun salute when the President is present at the event.

Romanian official

Other versions
Note that, in accordance with Romanian law, there are no official translations of the anthem.

See also
"Limba noastră", national anthem of Moldova
"Dimãndarea pãrinteascã", ethnic anthem of the Aromanians

Notes

References

External links

Romania: Deșteaptă-te, române! – Audio of the national anthem of Romania, with information and lyrics (archive link)

Romania: Deșteaptă-te, române! – Video with scores and authentic video material of the Romanian revolution 1989 of the national anthem of Romania, with information in description and Creative Commons resources for Download in description (archive link)

Songs about revolutions
European anthems
Romanian patriotic songs
National symbols of Romania
1848 songs
Romanian Revolution
National anthems
National anthem compositions in E minor
National anthem compositions in F minor
Romanian-language songs